Dominica is an island-nation in the Caribbean that is part of the Lesser Antilles chain of islands.

Anse Du Mai
Anse Soldat
Anse Maho
Batalie Bay
Batibou Bay
Bout Sable Bay
Douglas Bay
Grand Bay
Grand Marigot Bay
Hampstead Bay
Hodges Bay
Londonderry Bay
Pagua Bay
Petite Soufrière Bay
Prince Rupert Bay
Pringles Bay
Rosalie Bay
Soufrière Bay
St. David's Bay
Toucari Bay
Woodbridge Bay
Woodford Hill Bay

References

External links

 
Bays
Dominica